The Jungholzhausen massacre was a war crime committed by the 63rd Infantry Division of the US Army on 15 April 1945 during the Western Allied invasion of Germany. Between 13 and 30 Waffen-SS and Wehrmacht prisoners of war were executed by the division's 254th Infantry Regiment after heavy fighting near the village of Jungholzhausen.

Massacre
In April 1945, the 254th Infantry Regiment suffered heavy casualties during the battle for the Hohenlohe district. Wehrmacht combat engineers and mostly 17-year old Waffen-SS soldiers from Leoben in Styria engaged the regiment in combat near the village of Jungholzhausen. After the battle, the villagers counted the bodies of 63 German soldiers, out of whom at least 13 and possibly up to 20 or 30 had been killed after surrendering. An eyewitness observed the US execution with submachine guns of four Waffen-SS troops during the night. US massacres of German prisoners of war were commonplace in the district of Hohenlohe.

Legacy and 1996 US investigation
According to German historian Klaus-Dietmar Henke, the war crimes committed by the US in Germany in 1945 were largely shrouded in silence until the 1990s, when German local newspapers began reporting on them. In 1996, the United States Army Criminal Investigation Command investigated the massacre of 15 April 1945 in Braunsbach-Jungholzhausen but could not identify the perpetrators of the massacre.

Citations

References
 
 

1945 in Germany
Massacres in 1945
World War II prisoner of war massacres by the United States
April 1945 events in Europe
Massacres in Germany
Mass murder in 1945
1945 murders in Germany